γ-Oryzanol is a mixture of lipids derived from rice (Oryza sativa). γ-Oryzanol occurs mainly in the fat fraction of rice bran and rice bran oil.

Originally thought to be a single chemical compound, it is now known to be a mixture of ferulic acid esters of phytosterols and triterpenoids, particularly cycloartenyl ferulate, 24-methylenecycloartanyl ferulate, and campesteryl ferulate, which together account for 80% of γ-oryzanol.

Composition

Uses
γ-Oryzanol has been used in Japan for menopausal symptoms, mild anxiety, stomach upset, and high cholesterol. It is still approved in China for this use. However, there is no meaningful evidence supporting its efficacy for these purposes.

In the United States, it is sold as a sports supplement, but existing research does not support the belief that it has any ergogenic or testosterone-raising effects.

References

Lipids